Dunkerton is a city in Black Hawk County, Iowa, United States. The population was 842 at the time of the 2020 census. It is part of the Waterloo–Cedar Falls Metropolitan Statistical Area.

History

In 1853, two brothers, James and John Dunkerton, walked from Dubuque, Iowa, to stake out a claim of land near Lester. This claim became the town known as Lesterton, and later Dunkerton. In 1854, John died and was buried in the small cemetery, which now holds four generations of Dunkertons. James remained and built up his land. On December 25, 1854, he married Christiana Hodges. At 60 years of age, James and his eldest son, sold a portion of their land to the railroad, requesting that the railroad be extended to Iowa. This act enabled the present City of Dunkerton to be established.

Attractions 
The city maintains four parks, including Charma Park, Eagle Scout Park, Gazebo Park, and Carol Hauptly Memorial Park, as well as Mixdorf Nature Preserve and the Dunkerton Sportsman's Club.

The historic Dunkerton Bridge spans Crane Creek, connecting Charma Park to the city. The pedestrian bridge was built in 1909 and is still usable today.

The Dunkerton Veterans Memorial Park on Main Street replaced an earlier hand-painted billboard containing the names of Dunkerton residents who had served in the military. The new monument, built in the early 2000s, allows families to purchase a brick engraved with the name of a veteran and details of their service. As of October 2003, there were 297 such bricks.

Arts and culture
Dunkerton celebrates "Dunkerton Days" in late July, with a car show, parade, mud volleyball tournament, fishing derby, and bike races, among other activities.  The highlight of Dunkerton Days is the fireworks show which brings many people from surrounding areas. Newly added to Dunkerton Days is the Rust + Dust Market, which is a flea market bringing people who like junk from all over Iowa.

Dunkerton Public Library

After many years of city planning and fundraising, the Dunkerton Public Library was rebuilt out of the flood zone and opened its doors in December, 2010.  The new facility includes computers, expanded inventory, and a special children's section.

Geography
Dunkerton is located at  (42.568329, -92.160075).

Demographics

2010 census
As of the census of 2010, there were 852 people, 327 households, and 237 families residing in the city. The racial makeup of the city was 96.1% White, 1.1% African American, 0.7% Asian, 0.4% from other races, and 1.8% from two or more races. Hispanic or Latino of any race were 2.6% of the population.

There were 327 households, of which 38.2% had children under the age of 18 living with them, 59.6% were married couples living together, 9.5% had a female householder with no husband present, 3.4% had a male householder with no wife present, and 27.5% were non-families. 24.5% of all households were made up of individuals, and 9.5% had someone living alone who was 65 years of age or older. The average household size was 2.61 and the average family size was 3.13.

The median age in the city was 35.3 years. 29.1% of residents were under the age of 18; 8.2% were between the ages of 18 and 24; 26.7% were from 25 to 44; 25.3% were from 45 to 64; and 10.8% were 65 years of age or older. The gender makeup of the city was 48.2% male and 51.8% female.

2000 census
As of the census of 2000, there were 749 people, 269 households, and 206 families. The racial makeup of the city was 96.26% White, 0.13% Native American, 1.20% Asian, 1.34% Pacific Islander, 0.80% from other races, and 0.27% from two or more races. Hispanic or Latino of any race were 0.80% of the population.

There were 269 households, out of which 41.6% had children under the age of 18 living with them, 66.2% were married couples living together, 7.8% had a female householder with no husband present, and 23.4% were non-families. 19.0% of all households were made up of individuals, and 8.2% had someone living alone who was 65 years of age or older. The average household size was 2.78 and the average family size was 3.18.

Age spread: 29.0% under the age of 18, 8.9% from 18 to 24, 30.4% from 25 to 44, 23.4% from 45 to 64, and 8.3% who were 65 years of age or older. The median age was 33 years. For every 100 females, there were 99.7 males. For every 100 females age 18 and over, there were 102.3 males.

The median income for a household in the city was $41,771, and the median income for a family was $48,229. Males had a median income of $31,083 versus $24,167 for females. The per capita income for the city was $15,863. About 4.4% of families and 5.9% of the population were below the poverty line, including 11.2% of those under age 18 and 3.5% of those age 65 or over.

References

External links 
 
  
 City Data Comprehensive Statistical Data and more about Dunkerton

Cities in Black Hawk County, Iowa
Cities in Iowa
Waterloo – Cedar Falls metropolitan area
1853 establishments in Iowa
Populated places established in 1853